While there is no Official Opposition in Holyrood, Jackson Carlaw, as leader of the largest party not in government, acts as the Leader of the Opposition. Carlaw was elected leader of the Scottish Conservatives in February 2020 and resigned in July 2020, and was succeeded by Douglas Ross.

Carlaw had already served as acting leader of the Scottish Conservatives from August 2019 until his election win in February, following Ruth Davidson's resignation. After he was appointed leader, he appointed members to his shadow cabinet. Carlaw's cabinet dissolved on 11 August 2020 by the Shadow Cabinet of Douglas Ross.

Shadow Cabinet

References 

British shadow cabinets
Scottish shadow cabinets